Quancetia Hamilton is a Canadian actress. She is most noted for her performance as Agent Nelson in the television series Call Me Fitz, for which she was a Canadian Screen Award nominee for Best Supporting Actress in a Comedy Series at the 2nd Canadian Screen Awards in 2014.

She has acted most prominently on stage, including in both the 2003 Theatre Passe Muraille and 2005 Princess of Wales Theatre productions of Da Kink in My Hair.

Filmography

Film

Television

References

External links

20th-century Canadian actresses
21st-century Canadian actresses
Canadian television actresses
Canadian film actresses
Canadian stage actresses
Black Canadian actresses
Living people
Year of birth missing (living people)